Truly Scrumptious is a song composed for the 1968 motion picture Chitty Chitty Bang Bang, and later performed in its 2002/2005 stage adaptation.  The song was written by Robert B. Sherman & Richard M. Sherman. It is about the lead female character, Truly.

The first time we hear the music to the song is when Truly (played by Sally Ann Howes in the film) motors up to the Potts' windmill with the children.  It is later sung to her by Adrian Hall and Heather Ripley (as Jeremy and Jemima), the twin children of widower Caractacus Potts (played by Dick Van Dyke in the film), and she sings the second verse back to them.  It occurs at the beach scene in the middle of the film when all the characters begin to fall in love with each other.

Reprise
This song is reprised later in the story as a counterpoint to another song entitled "Doll on a Music Box". When the song is sung a second time, in counterpoint, it is then sung by Caractacus. Truly sings the counterpoint as an expression of her own, "real life" emotional detachment. The counterpoint is staccato whereas "Truly Scrumptious" has a legato melody.

Visual metaphor
This sequence is a part of Caractacus's story, which he is telling to Truly and his children.  In the song, Caractacus plays a flimsy rag doll, too flexible for his own good; whereas, Truly plays a precious, too-cutesy doll which is too rigid for her own good.  Twice during the counterpoint, the rag doll approaches the doll, only to be slapped in the face.  This mirrors the earlier "real life" story where Caractacus's first two interactions with Truly are mistimed as well (first in the workshop, then when Caractacus accidentally runs Truly's car off the road).  The rag doll keeps trying, when suddenly he captures his own reflection and realizes how foolish he appears.  It is only when Truly momentarily breaks character and shoves him slightly into the mirror to get his attention that he returns to his character.  The rag doll properly courts the doll and is about to kiss the doll's hand, when she retracts her hand from him just in time.  Rigidity wins out.  Only at the end of the movie do Caractacus and Truly truly see eye to eye.

Popular culture
In 1992, the "Doll on a Music Box"/"Truly Scrumptious" counterpoint was reenacted as part of a surrealistic sequence of the 1992 film, Arizona Dream starring Johnny Depp, Jerry Lewis, Faye Dunaway and Lili Taylor.
In 2002 and 2003, the song "Truly Scrumptious" was used as the backing music for a string of three British public information films by the Food Standards Agency promoting good food hygiene, voiced by Dervla Kirwan.
In 2006, the song "Truly Scrumptious" was sung in the BBC TV series How Do You Solve a Problem like Maria?.
In 2008, the song "Truly Scrumptious" was sung in the BBC TV series I'd Do Anything.
The song was parodied for use in a UK advert for Truvia sweetener in 2012, sung by Australian soprano Ebony Buckle.

External links
 Press release for Truvia advert launch

References

1968 songs
Songs from Chitty Chitty Bang Bang
Songs written by the Sherman Brothers